Delfina Ortega Díaz (October 20, 1845 – April 8, 1880) was the first lady of Mexico, as Porfirio Díaz's niece and first wife. She married him in 1867. They had eight children, of which two survived, Porfirio Díaz Ortega and Luz Victoria Díaz Ortega.

She died in 1880 from complications of childbirth and was survived by Porfirio.

References

1845 births
1880 deaths
Deaths in childbirth
First ladies of Mexico